Inverugie is a small village in Aberdeenshire, Scotland, to the northwest of Peterhead.

Sources
Inverugie in the Gazetteer for Scotland
Historical overview of Inverugie in the Gazetteer for Scotland

Villages in Aberdeenshire